Chad Kimball (born September 2, 1976) is an American stage actor known for roles in musical theatre, especially Huey Calhoun in the Broadway musical Memphis and Milky White in the 2002 Broadway revival of Into the Woods.

Early life and career
Kimball was raised in Seattle, Washington, and graduated from Boston Conservatory with a BFA in musical theatre in 1999. 

After moving to New York City, he joined the Broadway musical The Civil War, three weeks before it closed. He was in the Off-Broadway revival of Godspell in 2000 and the Broadway revival of Into the Woods in 2002 as Milky White the cow and an understudy for Jack and the Wolf/Rapunzel’s Prince. He appeared in the Broadway musicals Lennon and Good Vibrations in 2005. During this period, he also appeared in regional theatre as Anthony in Sweeney Todd at the Signature Theatre (1999), Baby at the Paper Mill Playhouse, Millburn, New Jersey (2004), and Little Fish in 2007 at the Blank Theatre, Los Angeles.

Memphis and later years
Kimball originated the lead role of Huey Calhoun in the musical Memphis at the La Jolla Playhouse in 2008, and starred in the role in the Broadway production until fall 2011. He was nominated for a Tony Award for Best Actor in a Musical for the role. Kimball appears in the filmed version, Memphis: Direct from Broadway by Broadway Worldwide.

In 2017 he returned to Broadway as Kevin T. in the musical Come from Away. In March 2020, he contracted and recovered from COVID-19. Later that year, on Twitter, he criticized, and pledged to disobey, COVID public health restrictions regarding singing in churches. His tweet caused backlash. He was not invited to return to Come from Away when the show resumed production in 2021 and has sued the producers.

References

External links

 (archive)

"Quick Wit: Chad Kimball", August 16, 2000 at theatermania.com
Interview, September 11, 2005, at broadwayworld.com
 (archive)

1976 births
Living people
American male musical theatre actors
American male stage actors
Boston Conservatory at Berklee alumni
Place of birth missing (living people)
Male actors from Seattle